Rhododendron rigidum (基毛杜鹃) is a rhododendron species native to Sichuan and Yunnan, China, where it grows at altitudes of . The flowers are white to reddish purple.

Synonyms
 Rhododendron caeruleum H.Lév.
 Rhododendron eriandrum H.Lév. ex Hutch.
 Rhododendron hesperium Balf.f. & Forrest
 Rhododendron racemosum var. rigidum (Franch.) Rehnelt
 Rhododendron rarosquameum Balf.f.
 Rhododendron sycnanthum Balf.f. & W.W.Sm.

References
 "Rhododendron rigidum", Franchet, Bull. Soc. Bot. France. 33: 233. 1886.

rigidum